Ken, Kenneth or Kenny Wilson may refer to:
Ken Wilson (ice hockey) (1923–2008), Canadian minor hockey league general manager and owner
Ken Wilson (mountaineering writer) (1941–2016), British mountaineering writer, editor and publisher
Ken Wilson (sportscaster) (born 1947), American sports broadcaster
Kenneth B. Wilson (born 1938), Justice of the New Mexico Supreme Court 
Kenneth L. Wilson (1896–1979), American track athlete
Kenneth G. Wilson (1936–2013), American theoretical physicist
Kenneth G. Wilson (author) (1923–2003), American author and editor
Kenneth T. Wilson (born 1936), American politician in the New Jersey General Assembly
Kenneth Wilson (canoeist) (born 1938), American Olympic canoer
Kenneth Robert Wilson, American drummer, aka Kenny, better known as Ginger Fish
Kenny Wilson (footballer) (born 1946), former Scottish footballer
Kenny Gasana (born 1984), American-born Rwandan basketball player, formerly known as Kenny Wilson
Kenny Wilson (baseball) (born 1990), American baseball outfielder
Ken Wilson (rugby league), Australian rugby league player
Ken Wilson (American football) (born 1964), American football coach

See also
Wilson (name)